Shandon is a village and census-designated place (CDP) in San Luis Obispo County, California, United States. The population was 1,295 at the 2010 census, up from 986 at the 2000 census. Shandon lies by the San Juan River.

Etymology

The town is named for a town that appeared in Harper's Magazine in 1891.

Geography

Shandon is located at the bottom of the San Juan Valley, where San Juan Creek and Cholame Creek come together to form the Estrella River, which flows west to meet the Salinas River north of Paso Robles. Shandon is also at the junction of State Routes 41 and 46, at the southwestern portion of the stretch where the two highways merge for approximately six miles. The San Andreas Fault cuts perpendicular to the highways here, six miles from Shandon.

Shandon is located at  (35.656178, -120.378817).

Climate

Shandon experiences a hot-summer Mediterranean climate (Köppen climate classification: Csa), characterized by hot, dry summers and cool, moist winters. Owing to its location inland from the coast, diurnal temperature variation is high, reaching a maximum of  during summer.

Demographics

2010

At the 2010 census Shandon had a population of 1,295. The racial makeup of Shandon was 840 (64.9%) White, 34 (2.6%) African American, 18 (1.4%) Native American, 7 (0.5%) Asian, 2 (0.2%) Pacific Islander, 352 (27.2%) from other races, and 42 (3.2%) from two or more races. Hispanic or Latino of any race were 693 people (53.5%).

The census reported that 1,293 people (99.8% of the population) lived in households, 2 (0.2%) lived in non-institutionalized group quarters, and no one was institutionalized.

There were 371 households, 187 (50.4%) had children under the age of 18 living in them, 219 (59.0%) were opposite-sex married couples living together, 46 (12.4%) had a female householder with no husband present, 24 (6.5%) had a male householder with no wife present.  There were 18 (4.9%) unmarried opposite-sex partnerships, and 2 (0.5%) same-sex married couples or partnerships. 62 households (16.7%) were one person and 15 (4.0%) had someone living alone who was 65 or older. The average household size was 3.49.  There were 289 families (77.9% of households); the average family size was 3.83.

The age distribution was 418 people (32.3%) under the age of 18, 127 people (9.8%) aged 18 to 24, 373 people (28.8%) aged 25 to 44, 284 people (21.9%) aged 45 to 64, and 93 people (7.2%) who were 65 or older.  The median age was 30.6 years. For every 100 females, there were 103.6 males.  For every 100 females age 18 and over, there were 104.9 males.

There were 412 housing units at an average density of 137.8 per square mile, of the occupied units 239 (64.4%) were owner-occupied and 132 (35.6%) were rented. The homeowner vacancy rate was 5.5%; the rental vacancy rate was 8.3%.  732 people (56.5% of the population) lived in owner-occupied housing units and 561 people (43.3%) lived in rental housing units.

2000
At the 2000 census there were 986 people, 267 households, and 225 families in the CDP. The racial makeup of the CDP was 71.20% White, 0.51% African American, 0.61% Native American, 0.51% Asian, 20.59% from other races, and 6.59% from two or more races. Hispanic or Latino of any race were 47.67%.

Of the 267 households 49.8% had children under the age of 18 living with them, 68.2% were married couples living together, 10.1% had a female householder with no husband present, and 15.4% were non-families. 10.9% of households were one person and 3.4% were one person aged 65 or older.  The average household size was 3.67 and the average family size was 3.86.

The age distribution was 34.7% under the age of 18, 13.6% from 18 to 24, 30.0% from 25 to 44, 15.6% from 45 to 64, and 6.1% 65 or older.  The median age was 26 years. For every 100 females, there were 113.9 males.  For every 100 females age 18 and over, there were 119.8 males.

The median household income was $35,000 and the median family income  was $32,273. Males had a median income of $28,068 versus $21,786 for females. The per capita income for the CDP was $11,174.  About 16.7% of families and 22.9% of the population were below the poverty line, including 30.3% of those under age 18 and 13.6% of those age 65 or over.

Government

Business
This part of the county's economy is largely based in agriculture.  Several large vineyard plantings, including Arciero, Sunview Shandon, Shandon Valley Partners, Red Cedar Vineyards, and French Camp Vineyards, represent important employers in the region.

There also is CalFire Station 31 at 501 Centre Street  Shandon, CA 93461 (805) 238-4957

Shandon has a 15-member Paid-Call Firefighter company who respond on all incidents via radio pager. Company 31 is responsible for maintaining and responding Engine 31 during the summer months.

Shandon has a State of California Department of Transportation District 5 CalTrans yard located at 400 West Centre St.

Shandon is home to Shandon Unified School District which includes Shandon Elementary, Shandon High School, and Parkfield Elementary.

Shandon Post Office is located at 200 East Centre St

School
Public education in Shandon is provided by the Shandon Joint Unified School District.

Sports 
Shandon High School's varsity mascot is the Outlaws, and the school presently competes in the Coast Valley League.

CIF Team Championships 

 1979, Southern Section/Small School Division: Girls Basketball

CIF Finalists/Team Runner-Up 

 1998, Southern Section/8-Man Small Division: Football

Notable residents
Former Deputy Secretary of State, National Security Advisor, and United States Secretary of the Interior William P. Clark, Jr. resided near Shandon until his death in August 2013; he built Chapel Hill on the hill above his ranch. Former 2008–2009 National FFA Secretary Nessie Early is a resident of Shandon.

References

External links

Census-designated places in San Luis Obispo County, California
Census-designated places in California